The 2020 Quaife Mini Challenge season was the nineteenth season of the Mini Challenge UK. The season was supposed to start on 28 March at Donington Park and end on 20 October at Donington Park. It included sixteen rounds across the UK, all the JCW Class races and 2 of the Cooper Class races support the British Touring Car Championship. The season featured the start of the JCW Mini Challenge Trophy.

Due to the COVID–19 pandemic, the schedule was drastically reduced to five rounds starting 1/2 August.

Calendar
The original calendar was as follows:

Due to the COVID–19 pandemic, the new schedule is as follows:

Entry list

Results

JCW Class

Championship standings
Scoring system
Championship points were awarded for the all finishing positions in each Championship Race. Entries were required to complete 75% of the winning car's race distance in order to be classified and earn points. There were bonus points awarded for Pole Position and Fastest Lap.

Championship Race points

Drivers' Championship

JCW Class

References

External links
 

Mini Challenge UK
Mini Challenge UK